The Roman Catholic Metropolitan Archdiocese of Calcutta is an ecclesiastical Latin Church territory of the Catholic Church in India.

History
The archdiocese was originally erected as the Apostolic Vicariate of Bengal in 1834 by Pope Gregory XVI, and renamed as the Apostolic Vicariate of Western Bengal in 1850 by Gregory's successor, Pope Pius IX.

On 1 September 1886, when the Catholic hierarchy was created in British India by Pope Leo XIII, the vicariate was elevated to the rank of metropolitan archdiocese and renamed as the "Archdiocese of Calcutta".

Over the course of times the archdiocese was frequently divided and new metropolitan provinces were created: Ranchi, Guwahati and Patna. , the metropolitan province of Calcutta covers the state of West Bengal. The suffragan sees are: Asansol, Bagdogra, Baruipur, Darjeeling, Jalpaiguri, Krishnagar and Raiganj.

The archdiocese's cathedral, the seat of its archbishop, is the Cathedral of the Most Holy Rosary, commonly called the "Portuguese Church". Calcutta also houses the oldest Catholic church in the area, the Basilica of the Holy Rosary, in Bandel - a former Portuguese settlement - some 40 kilometers (25 miles) north of the city of Kolkata.

The current archbishop of Calcutta is Thomas D'Souza, having been appointed by Pope Benedict XVI on 23 February 2012.

Territory
The archdiocese of Calcutta currently covers the Districts of Bankura, Howrah, Hooghly, Kolkata, Paschim Medinipur, Purba Medinipur and North 24 Parganas in the state of West Bengal.

List of Ordinaries of Calcutta

Apostolic vicars of Bengal
 1834 - 1838 : Robert Saint–Leger
 1838 - 1840 : Jean-Louis Taberd
 1840 - 1850 : Patrick Joseph Carew

Apostolic vicars of West Bengal
 1850 - 1855 : Patrick Joseph Carew
 1855 - 1859 : Marc-Thomas Olliffe
 1858 - 1864 : Sede vacante (Auguste Goiran, Administrator)
 1864 - 1865 : Augustus van Heule
 1865 - 1867 : Sede vacante (Honoré van der Stuyft, Administrator)
 1867 - 1877 : Walter Herman Jacobus Steins
 1877 - 1886 : Paul François Marie Goethals

Archbishops of Calcutta
 1886 - 1901 : Paul François Marie Goethals
 1902 - 1924 : Brice Meuleman
 1924 - 1960 : Ferdinand Perier
 1960 - 1962 : Vivian Anthony Dyer
 1962 - 1969 : Albert Vincent D'Souza
 1969 - 1986 : Lawrence Trevor Cardinal Picachy
 1986 - 2002 : Henry Sebastian D'Souza
 2002 - 2012 : Lucas Sirkar
 2012 - Pres : Thomas D'Souza

Saints and causes for canonisation
 St. Teresa of Calcutta lived and served in Calcutta.

See also
Catholic Ecclesiastical Provinces in India
Diocese of Calcutta of the Church of North India
Roman Catholicism in India

References

External links
Archdiocese of Calcutta
Catholic-Hierarchy
GCatholic.org

Christianity in Kolkata
Calcutta
Calcutta
Calcutta
1834 establishments in India